Horný Vék (also Vék) is a village in the Nitra Region of Slovakia.

References

Villages in Slovakia